Baja Verapaz is a department in Guatemala. The capital is Salamá.

Baja Verapaz contains the Mario Dary Biotope Preserve, preserving the native flora and fauna of the region, especially the endangered national bird of Guatemala, the Resplendent Quetzal.

Municipalities  
Cubulco 
Granados 
Purulhá 
Rabinal
Salamá 
San Jerónimo 
San Miguel Chicaj  
Santa Cruz El Chol

References

External links
Baja Verapaz Website

 
Departments of Guatemala